"Something to Believe In" is a power ballad  by American glam metal band Poison, being the second single from their 1990 album Flesh & Blood. "Something to Believe In" was also released on the Best of Ballads & Blues album in 2003, with alternate lyrics (part 2).

The song peaked at number 4 on the US Billboard Hot 100, becoming their 6th and last top 10 hit, number 5 on the mainstream rock charts, number 35 in the UK and number 44 on the Australian charts. It was the last Top 10 on the Billboard chart for the band to date.

Background
This song was dedicated to James Kimo Maano, a security guard and best friend of Bret Michaels who had died some time earlier.

The cover art for the single depicts a tattoo on Michaels' arm of a cross with the words "Something to Believe In".  The tattoo artist, according to Michaels, had been drinking and spelled "believe" incorrectly putting the "e" before the "i".  It was attempted to be corrected by adding a rose to the cross that covered the misspelling, but Michaels was never satisfied with the results.  In the first season of the reality show Rock of Love, Michaels goes to a tattoo shop where the tattoo artist properly touches up the tattoo.

Music video
During the filming of the video, unbeknownst to Michaels, the director had inserted footage of James Kimo Maano which was playing on a screen in front of Bret. This was done to try to draw an emotional reaction from Michaels. It worked so well that Michaels lost his composure and had to leave the set for several hours. On the final cut of the video, during the second verse, Michaels can be seen visually holding back tears as he momentarily stops singing.

Reception 
"Something to Believe In" is widely regarded as one of Poison's best songs. In 2017, Billboard and OC Weekly ranked the song number four and number one, respectively, on their lists of the 10 greatest Poison songs.

Personnel 
 Bret Michaels - Lead Vocals, Acoustic Guitar, Backing Vocals  
 C.C. DeVille - Lead Guitar, Rhythm Guitar (Used in the choruses and sporadically in the verses), Backing Vocals 
 Bobby Dall - Bass, Backing Vocals 
 Rikki Rockett - Drums, Backing Vocals

with

John Webster - Piano

Charts

Weekly charts

Year-end charts

Decade-end charts

Certifications

See also
List of glam metal albums and songs

References

External links
All Music Guide (2/5) [  link]

Poison (American band) songs
Songs written by Bret Michaels
Songs written by Rikki Rockett
Songs written by Bobby Dall
Songs written by C.C. DeVille
1990 singles
Song recordings produced by Bruce Fairbairn
1990s ballads
1990 songs
Anti-war songs
Commemoration songs
Songs critical of religion
Glam metal ballads
Rock ballads
Capitol Records singles